Dr. George Fullerton (1802 – 24 September 1883) was a Member of the Queensland Legislative Council.

Early life

Fullerton  was born in County Londonderry, Ireland, to Archibald Fullerton and his wife Elizabeth (née Church). He arrived in Australia in 1841 was appointed Medical registrar of New South Wales in 1842. He then moved to Queensland in 1857 where he was a medical practitioner.

Politics
Fullerton was appointed to the Queensland Legislative Council on 1 May 1860 and served for four years until his resignation on 22 May 1864. He was a spokesman for the squattocracy on important issues such as the use of coolie labour. It was said he had all the strengths and weaknesses of a conservative Victorian gentleman.

Personal life
Fullerton married Julia Moffat  in 1854 and together had 2 children. He returned to Sydney in 1878 and died there in 1883. Fullerton was buried in the Rookwood Cemetery.

References

External links 

Members of the Queensland Legislative Council
1802 births
1883 deaths
Politicians from County Londonderry
Irish emigrants to colonial Australia
19th-century Australian politicians
Pre-Separation Queensland